The Fringe Dwellers is a 1986 film directed by Bruce Beresford, based on the 1961 novel The Fringe Dwellers by Western Australian author Nene Gare. The film is about a young Aboriginal girl who dreams of life beyond the family camp that sits on the fringe of white society (the term fringe dwellers having specific application in Australia).

The film is acclaimed as being the first Australian film featuring Indigenous actors in all the major roles. It achieved critical and international success when it was released in 1986, but gained only a lukewarm reception in Australia.

Plot
Trilby (Kristina Nehm) is a young Aboriginal woman living with her people on the outskirts of everyday Australian society. Trilby encourages her mother (Justine Saunders) to apply for a Housing Commission home being built in an area inhabited mostly by wealthier white families. Her mother, sister Noonah, and Trilby save enough for them all (father and younger brother as well) to move there from the "fringe". They buy some new furniture for the house and improve their station in life. But there is a culture clash. Trilby learns that her family is actually happier surrounded by their community and extended family, and that her own goals are not necessarily the goals of others in her life. With xenophobic neighbors casting a constant judgmental eye, Trilby and her boyfriend, Phil (Ernie Dingo), attempt to find happiness in their new environment. Trilby becomes pregnant, gives birth, but drowns her baby, making it look like an accident. Her family leave their suburban house after Trilby's father loses all their rent money in a card game: the family return to their house in the camp. Trilby, however, leaves on a bus bound for the city.

Cast
Justine Saunders as Mollie Comeaway
 Kristina Nehm as Trilby Comeaway
Kylie Belling as Noonah Comeaway
Bob Maza as Joe Comeaway
Denis Walker as Bartie Comeaway	
Ernie Dingo as Phil	
Oodgeroo Noonuccal as Eva (billed as Kath Walker) 
Marlene Bell as Hannah
Malcolm Silva as Charlie
Michele Miles as Blanchie
Michelle Torres as Audrena
Lisa-Jane Stockwell as Matron
Gordon Beitzel as the Publican

Production
Beresford had been interested in making a film from the novel since he read it in the mid-1970s, buying his copy at a second-hand book shop in London. Funding was difficult to raise but eventually was done through the Australian Film Commission and Queensland Film Corporation. The Fringe Dwellers was shot in Cherbourg and Murgon, Queensland, Australia.

Awards
The film was nominated for seven AFI Awards and won for the Best Adapted Screenplay (Bruce Beresford, Rhoisin Beresford). It was also entered into the 1986 Cannes Film Festival. Some Aboriginal activists walked out of the screening at Cannes.

Box office
The Fringe Dwellers grossed $174,433 at the box office in Australia.

See also
Cinema of Australia

References

Further reading

External links

The Fringe Dwellers at the Australian screen
The Fringe Dwellers at Oz Movies

1986 films
Atlantic Entertainment Group films
Australian drama films
Films directed by Bruce Beresford
1986 drama films
Films shot in Queensland
Films set in Queensland
1980s English-language films
Films about Aboriginal Australians